Lithium monoxide anion (LiO−) is a superbase existing in the gas phase. It was the strongest known base until 2008, when the isomeric diethynylbenzene dianions were determined to have a higher proton affinity. The methanide ion CH3− was the strongest known base before lithium monoxide anion was discovered.

LiO− has a proton affinity of ~1782 kJ mol−1.

Synthesis of the lithium monoxide anion 
The anion is prepared in a mass spectrometer by successive decarboxylation and decarbonylation of lithium oxalate anion under collision induced dissociation (CID) conditions: LiO(C=O)(CO) → LiOCO− + CO2, LiOCO− → LiO− + CO.

The above method to synthesize the lithium monoxide anion is inefficient and difficult to carry out. The required ion rapidly reacts with traces of moisture and molecular oxygen present in the air. The reaction is further intensified by the high pressure argon that is introduced into the instrument to carry out the CID step.

References

See also 
Lithium oxide

Superbases
Lithium compounds